The 1996 United States presidential election in Montana took place on November 5, 1996, as part of the 1996 United States presidential election. Voters chose three representatives, or electors to the Electoral College, who voted for president and vice president.

Montana voted for Senate Majority Leader Bob Dole over President Bill Clinton by a slim margin of 2.88%. Billionaire businessman Ross Perot (Reform Party of the United States of America-TX) finished in third, with 13.56% of the popular vote in Montana. , this is the last election in which Sheridan County, Dawson County, and Mineral County voted for the Democratic candidate.

With 13.56% of the popular vote, Montana would prove to be Ross Perot's second strongest state in the 1996 election after Maine.

Montana was one of three states won by Clinton in 1992 that Bob Dole was able to flip, the others being Colorado and Georgia.

Results

By county

See also
 United States presidential elections in Montana
 Presidency of Bill Clinton

References

Montana
1996
1996 Montana elections